Calochortus flexuosus is a species of lily known by the common names winding Mariposa lily and straggling Mariposa lily.

This is a bulbous perennial wildflower native to the Southwestern United States, the Mojave Desert in California, and northern Mexico. It is most often found in desert scrub, growing up through low shrubs.

Description
Calochortus flexuosus is mainly one long naked stem with only one or two small leaves toward the base. The stem may branch and is usually winding and bent or curving.

At the end of the stem is a showy flower in shades of pink or lavender to white, with solid yellow and stripes or spots of white and red at the base of each petal.

History
Calochortus flexuosus was published as a new species by Sereno Watson in 1873, based on material collected by Ellen Powell Thompson in 1872 in the vicinity of Kanab, Utah, during the US Topographical and Geological Survey of the Colorado River (led by John Wesley Powell). Her specimen, the holotype, resides in the United States National Herbarium (US).

References

External links
USDA Plants Profile for Calochortus flexuosus (winding mariposa lily)
Calflora Database: Calochortus flexuosus (winding mariposa,  winding mariposa lily)
Jepson Manual Treatment of Calochortus flexuosus
UC Photos gallery: Calochortus flexuosus

flexuosus
Flora of the California desert regions
Flora of Colorado
Flora of New Mexico
Flora of the Great Basin
Flora of the Southwestern United States
Natural history of the Mojave Desert
Taxa named by Sereno Watson
Flora without expected TNC conservation status